XHMQM-FM is a radio station on 90.9 FM in Mérida, Yucatán. It is owned by Cadena RASA and carries La Ke Buena grupera format from Radiópolis.

History

XEMQ-AM 1240 received its concession on December 18, 1941. It was owned by Lázaro Achurra Suárez and sold to Radio Mayab in 1970. XEMQ moved to 810 kHz in the 1990s.

It migrated to FM after being authorized in 2010. Its callsign was changed to XHMQM-FM with an added M for Mérida.

References

Radio stations in Yucatán
Radio stations established in 1941